Shanghai is considered to be a global destination for international education, and has been referred to as an "education Mecca" because the city has consistently topped international rankings. In Shanghai, there are three types of educational institutions expatriates can select from: International schools, bilingual schools, and International Divisions of Public Schools. Within the ecosystem of Shanghai, there are many options for specifically desired curriculum, including American, British, French, German, and Singaporean International School options.

This is a list of international schools in Shanghai, China:

Britannica International School Shanghai
British International School Shanghai
Concordia International School Shanghai
Dulwich College Shanghai
Shanghai French School
Fudan International School
German School Shanghai
Harrow International School Shanghai
Hong Qiao International School - Rainbow Bridge International School
Nord Anglia International School Shanghai, Pudong
Shanghai American School
Shanghai Community International School
Shanghai High School International Division
Shanghai Japanese School
Shanghai Livingston American School
Shanghai Pinghe School
Shanghai Qibao Dwight High School
Shanghai Rego International School
Shanghai Singapore International School
Shanghai United International School
Shanghai World Foreign Language Middle School
SMIC Private School (also known as Semiconductor Manufacturing International Corporation Private School)
Ulink College of Shanghai
The British International School Shanghai, Puxi Campus
The SMIC Private School
Wellington College International Shanghai
Western International School of Shanghai
Xiwai International School
Yew Chung International School of Shanghai
Yew Wah School of Shanghai
YK Pao School

References 

Shanghai
 
International schools
International schools
Shanghai